The Capela dos Ossos  (English: Chapel of Bones) is one of the best-known monuments in Évora, Portugal. It is a small interior chapel located next to the entrance of the Church of St. Francis. The Chapel gets its name because the interior walls are covered and decorated with human skulls and bones.

Origin
The Capela dos Ossos was built by Franciscan monks. An estimated 5,000 corpses were exhumed to decorate the walls of the chapel. The bones, which came from ordinary people who were buried in Évora's medieval cemeteries, were arranged by the Franciscans in a variety of patterns.

Description
Light enters through three small openings on the left. Its walls and eight pillars are decorated in carefully arranged bones and skulls held together by cement. The ceiling is made of white painted brick and is painted with death motifs. The number of skeletons of friars was calculated to be about 5,000, coming from the cemeteries that were situated inside several dozen churches. Some of these skulls have been scribbled with graffiti. Two desiccated corpses, one of which is a child, are in glass display cases. And at the roof of chapel, the phrase "Melior est die mortis die nativitatis (Better is the day of death than the day of birth)" (Ecclesiastes, 7, 1) from Vulgate is written.

Poem

Inside the Capela dos Ossos a poem about the need to reflect on one's existence hangs in an old wooden frame on one of the pillars. It is attributed to Fr. António da Ascenção Teles, parish priest of the village of São Pedro (wherein the Church of Saint Francis with its Capela dos Ossos was erected) from 1845 to 1848.

Images

See also
Capuchin Crypt
Capuchin catacombs of Palermo
Memento Mori
Sedlec Ossuary
Skull Tower
Skull Chapel, Czermna

References

Turner, J., Grove Dictionary of Art, MacMillan, 1996 - .
The Rough Guide to Portugal - 11th edition March 2005 - .
Rentes de Carvalho, J., Portugal - De Arbeiderspers, Amsterdam, 1999 - .

Buildings and structures in Évora
Ossuaries
Monuments and memorials in Portugal
Roman Catholic chapels in Portugal
Visionary environments
Buildings and structures in Évora District
Tourist attractions in Évora District